Fotbal Club Progresul Caracal was a Romanian professional football club from Caracal, Olt County, Romania.

History
Răsăritul Caracal was founded in 1924. Among the founding members of this sports association were: Mircea Botoi, Gheorghe Dumitrescu, Tudor Voiculescu, Ștefan Săndulescu, supported by a few people with financial possibilities, including: Stavarache Borcescu, Ionică Brătașanu or Tudor Popescu.

The first major competition at which Răsăritul Caracal started was the 1926–1927 season of the Oltenia Regional Championship, together with Rovine Grivița, Craiu-Iovan, Tinerimea, Generală, all from Craiova and Oltul Slatina and where it has been a constant presence for two decades.

The club was taken over by the management of the site that built the Bucharest-Craiova railway, changing its name to CFR Caracal (Căile Ferate Române) and participating in the first season of Divizia B, 1946–47, after the Second World War, finishing 14th.

In 1947–48 season, CFR Caracal finished on 9th place, but due to the reorganization of Divizia B was relegated in Divizia C.

In February 1949, the shutting of Divizia C was announced, and CFR Caracal, which was in 10th place, was demoted to the regional championship.

Followed two decades in the Oltenia Regional Championship, during which period the club changed its name several times. In 1958, the club was taken over by the local authorities and for the ten years it was called Progresul Caracal and Răsăritul Caracal.

The best result obtained during this period was in the 1963–64 season of the Romanian Cup. The team led by Alexandru Apolzan reached the Round of 32, but lost to Farul Constanța, 2–3, in a match played at Caracal.

In 1968, the club was renamed again as CFR Caracal and after the territorial reorganization of the country and the dissolution of the Regional Championship, the club played in the newly established Olt County Championship.

CFR Caracal will remain in the history of the Olt County Championship as the first county football champion, the team led by Ion Pârvulescu won the 1968–69 Olt County Championship, but lost the promotion play-off in Divizia C against Petrolul Târgoviște, the champion of Dâmbovița County, after a series of three matches (2–2, 2–2 and 0–1 on neutral ground at Ștefănești).

In 1969, after losing the promotion, the management of the club was changed again, the team being taken over by the canning factory and renamed as FC (Fabrica de Conserve).

At the end of 1969–70 season, with the same Ion Pârvulescu on the bench and with players like: Oancea – Frăsineanu, Mototolu, M. Pătru, Cheran, Toma – Octavian Platagă, Cârciumaru,  Petcu, Dumitru Neagu, Virgil Mincioagă, Dumitru Marcu among others, the team sponsored by the canning factory, after won again the county championship and after won the promotion play-off against Metalul Mija ( 2–1 at Mija and 2–1 at Caracal), the champion of Dâmbovița County, manages to promote in Divizia C.

In the 1970–71 season, FC Caracal clinched the 2nd place in the 4th series of the Divizia C, narrowly losing the promotion, at two points difference,  in front of Chimia Râmnicu Vâlcea.

In the 1971-72 season, the club was renamed once again as Răsăritul, finished that season on the 8th place. 

After two more seasons in which finished mid-table twice - 9th (1972–73) and 7th (1973–74), the team from Caracal enter in decline. Renamed again, this time as Vagonul Caracal, due to the collaboration with Uzina de Vagoane (Wagon Factory), the following two seasons was ended at the bottom of the table - 13th (1974–75) and 14th (1975–76) fighting to avoid the relegation.

Reverted to its old name, Răsăritul finally relegated to the Fourth Division at the end of the 1976–77 season, finishing on 15th place.

The following season, Răsăritul went on to win the Olt County Championship after a strong battle with the team of Uzina de Vagoane Caracal and the promotion play-off against Gloria Berevoești (1–1 at Berevoești and 2–1 at Caracal), the champion of Argeș County.

After an escape from relegation, at the end of the 1978–79 season, the next season brought for the football from Caracal a new name for the first team of the city, Sportul Muncitoresc Caracal, and a third place, with Constantin Năsturescu as a coach, at the end of the 1979–80 season. It was the best result from the second place at the beginning of the 1970s.

With Iuliu Uțu, the former goalkeeper of Dinamo București and Farul Constanța, as a head coach, Sportul  Muncitoresc finished on the 5th place in the 1980–81 season and on the 10th place in 1981–82 season. 

The team started the 1982–83 season with Ion Catană on the bench, which was replaced for the second part of the season with Ion Pârvulescu, finishing the championship on 5th place and managing to reach the first round proper of the Romanian Cup after nineteen years, but lost in front of Petrolul Ploiești with 0–3 at Caracal.

In the 1983–84 season, Sportul Muncitoresc Caracal, coached by Ion Pârvulescu, reached the first round proper of the Cupa României for the second consecutive time, where they will lose in front of the First Division club Corvinul with 0–1. In the championship, nothing spectacular, the Caracal team finished 10th in the VI Series of Divizia C. The squad included the following players: Florea Mantoc - Marinel Pâstae, Marin Boscor, V. Roșca, Doru Dumitrescu - Marinescu, Ion Antonescu, Georgel Mitran, Lăcătuș, Plotoagă, Ion Năuiu, Nedelcu, Nițu. 

The 1984–85 season, with Cornel Pavlovici as head coach, saw Sportul finishing seventh in the 6th Series of Third Division and qualifying again in the first round proper of the Cupa României, losing 0–1  to Rapid București. The lineup of Sportul: Florea Mantoc – V. Roșca I, I.Crețu, Teodor Nicu, M. Roșca II – Nedelcu (Constantin Lăcătuș), Ion Năuiu, Georgel Mitran – Pârvu, Nicolae Stângaciu, Plotoagă.

In the fall of 1985, Sportul Muncitoresc Caracal qualified for the fifth time, and for fourth consecutive time, in the Round of 32 of Cupa României. The good evolutions in the Cupa României predicted  the jump of Caracal football in a higher echelon. After the third-place from 1985–86 season, in the summer of 1987 Sportul Muncitoresc Caracal won the Series VI of Divizia C promoted in Second Division after four decades of regional, county or third-division championships.

Honours
Liga III
Winners (1): 1986–87
Runners-up (1): 1970–71
Liga IV – Olt County
Winners (6): 1968–69, 1969–70, 1977–78, 1997–98, 2000–01, 2001–02

League history

References

Defunct football clubs in Romania
Football clubs in Olt County
Association football clubs established in 1924
1924 establishments in Romania
Association football clubs disestablished in 2004
2004 disestablishments in Romania
Caracal, Romania